Megan Hunter (born 1984) is an English novelist and poet. She is best known for her debut novel The End We Start From which is going to be adapted into a movie by Benedict Cumberbatch's and Sophie Hunter production company SunnyMarch and Liza Marshall's Hera Productions.

Career 
Hunter's work has appeared in The White Review, the TLS, Literary Hub and BOMB Magazine.

Her debut novel The End We Start From was published by Picador and follows an environmental crisis in the UK which forces a new mother and her baby to abandon their home in London and flee north. Hunter cites conversations with her children about life and death and her own experiences with motherhood as inspiration for her first novel: "My own children regularly ask about death, and they have also asked me who or where they were before they were born. Partly because of this questioning I often feel the closeness of birth and death, the ways in which they are both the thresholds of life."

Personal life 
Hunter was born in Manchester and now lives in Cambridge with her family. She holds a Bachelor's degree in English literature from Sussex University and a Master of Philosophy in English Literature: Criticism and Culture from Jesus College, Cambridge. Megan Hunter is married to Sophie Hunter's brother.

Accolades 
Hunter's poetry has been shortlisted for the Bridport Prize. Her short story "Selfing" was nominated for the Aesthetica Creative Writing Award. Her debut novel The End We Start From was a  Barnes & Noble Discover Award Finalist in 2017 and won the Foreword Reviews Editor's Choice Award; it was also longlisted for the inaugural Aspen Words Literary Prize.

Bibliography 

 The End We Start From (2017)
 The Harpy (2020)

References 

Living people
1984 births
Date of birth missing (living people)
Writers from Manchester
21st-century English novelists
English women novelists
Alumni of the University of Sussex
Alumni of Jesus College, Cambridge
21st-century English poets
English women poets